The 1974 Delaware State Hornets football team represented Delaware State College—now known as Delaware State University—as a member of the Mid-Eastern Athletic Conference (MEAC) in the 1974 NCAA Division II football season. Led by eighth-year head coach Arnold Jeter in his final season, the Hornets compiled an overall record of 3–6 and a mark of 0–6 in conference play, placing last out of seven teams in the MEAC.

Schedule

References

Delaware State
Delaware State Hornets football seasons
Delaware State Hornets football